Mraka Sound (‘Zaliv Mraka’ \'za-liv 'mra-ka\) is a roughly rectangular water body extending 5 km in southeast-northwest direction and 4.2 km in southwest-northeast direction in Biscoe Islands, Antarctica.  It is bounded by Renaud Island on the south, Pickwick Island on the north and Winkle Island on the northeast.

The sound is named after the historical region of Mraka in Western Bulgaria.

Location

British mapping in 1971.

Maps
 British Antarctic Territory: Graham Coast.  Scale 1:200000 topographic map.  DOS 610 Series, Sheet W 65 64.  Directorate of Overseas Surveys, UK, 1971.
 Antarctic Digital Database (ADD). Scale 1:250000 topographic map of Antarctica. Scientific Committee on Antarctic Research (SCAR). Since 1993, regularly upgraded and updated.

References
 Bulgarian Antarctic Gazetteer. Antarctic Place-names Commission. (details in Bulgarian, basic data in English)
 Mraka Sound. SCAR Composite Antarctic Gazetteer.

Sounds of Graham Land
Landforms of the Biscoe Islands
Bulgaria and the Antarctic